Riotsville, U.S.A. is a 2022 American documentary film by Sierra Pettengill.

Summary
Using mainly archival footage shot by the media and U.S. government, the film examines fictional towns (in which the filmmaker discovered after reading author Rick Perlstein's 2008 book Nixonland) to combat rioters that were created by military officials during the civil unrest of 1960s America.

Reception
The film received 90% on Rotten Tomatoes from critics.

Awards
7th Critics' Choice Documentary Awards:
Best Archival Documentary (nomination)
Best Narration (nomination)
IDA Documentary Awards:
ABC News VideoSource Award (won)

See also
Counterculture of the 1960s
Police brutality in the United States
Copaganda
Kerner Commission
Institutional racism
Militarization of police

References

External links
Official trailer
Official website
Riotsville, U.S.A. on IMDb

Collage film
2022 documentary films
American documentary films
Films set in the 1960s
Collage television